Phycita nephodeella is a species of snout moth described by Émile Louis Ragonot in 1887. It is found in Italy and Transcaucasia.

The wingspan is about 26 mm.

References

Moths described in 1887
Phycitini
Moths of Europe